Nick of Time is the tenth studio album by the American singer Bonnie Raitt, released on March 21, 1989. It was Raitt's first album released by Capitol Records. A commercial breakthrough after years of personal and professional struggles, Nick of Time topped the Billboard 200 chart, selling five million copies, and won three Grammy Awards, including Album of the Year, which was presented to Raitt and producer Don Was. In 2003, the album was ranked number 229 on Rolling Stone magazine's list of the 500 greatest albums of all time, then was re-ranked at number 230 on the 2012 list. As of September 2020, it is ranked at number 492. The album was also included in the book 1001 Albums You Must Hear Before You Die. In 2022, the album was selected by the Library of Congress for preservation in the United States National Recording Registry for being "culturally, historically, or aesthetically significant".

Background
In 1983, Bonnie Raitt was dropped from Warner Bros. Records for not selling enough copies of her two previous albums, The Glow (1979) and Green Light (1982). This decision came just one day after she had finished recording her upcoming album, titled Tongue in Groove. Two years later, Raitt's affair with producer Rob Fraboni came to an end, and she was forced to dissolve her backing band as she could no longer afford to pay them. In addition to these personal problems, Warner Bros. announced they would release Tongue in Groove in 1986, now titled Nine Lives. This upset Raitt, as she now had to promote an album that she no longer had full control over. Raitt began to suffer from depression, and tried to distract herself with excessive eating, drinking, and partying. When asked about this period in her life, Raitt said: "I wasn't kicking and screaming into dementia, but I did have a complete emotional, physical, and spiritual breakdown."

After the release of Nine Lives, Raitt went on a concert tour. Pop star Prince was a fan of Raitt, and attended her performance at the Beverly Theater in Los Angeles. He later offered her a recording contract on his own label Paisley Park Records. Raitt agreed, and traveled to Minneapolis. Before she recorded any material however, she suffered a skiing accident and was hospitalized for two months. The injury gave her time to reflect on recent life choices. "It seemed that some changes needed to be made. I looked at myself and just felt I wasn't being the best version of me as I could. I wasn't going to blame anyone other than myself." Raitt attended Alcoholics Anonymous meetings, which she credits with giving her a new outlook on life.

Despite her newfound sobriety, Raitt was still in financial trouble. She left Paisley Park Records after the planned collaboration between her and Prince fell through. Without enough money to afford a backing band, Raitt played a series of acoustic gigs to simply keep afloat. It was during this period that Raitt met musician Don Was of the band Was (Not Was). They collaborated on the song "Baby Mine" for the 1988 album Stay Awake: Various Interpretations of Music from Vintage Disney Films, which featured contemporary interpretations of songs from Disney films. Raitt enjoyed working with Was, and he agreed to produce her upcoming album. The search for a record label proved more difficult, as many labels felt Raitt no longer had commercial viability. Co-manager Danny Golberg said at least fourteen executives passed on Raitt before Tim Devine of Capitol Records took an interest. In 1988, Raitt signed a recording contract with Capitol Records for $150,000.

Composition
Nick of Time features a smooth and understated rock sound. Stephen Thomas Erlewine of AllMusic wrote: "[Raitt] never rocks too hard, but there is grit to her singing and playing, even when the surfaces are clean and inviting." There are many genres explored in Nick of Time, including blues rock, country, R&B, and pop. When Was was announced as the producer, some listeners wondered if he would instill a funk rock sound into the album, given his reputation with Was (Not Was). Was decided to instead maintain the laid-back blues sound Raitt had developed earlier in her career. According to Raitt: "There's less production, less slickness. Basically, it's a return to my roots."

Before Raitt signed with Capitol Records, she and Was had recorded some early demos at Was's home studio. These early demos focused on music that was stripped down, similar to Raitt's acoustic gigs. Was wanted to showcase her musical talents by choosing songs that worked without a backing band. These demos were then properly recorded over the course of a week at Ocean Way Recording in Los Angeles on preparation for the album's release. Because they had already worked on the songs, recording sessions were fairly quick. About two tracks were recorded a day. Engineer Ed Cherney noted how most of the music was recorded live in studio as opposed to recording each instrument individually. This was because Raitt was comfortable jamming with other musicians.

Many of the songs deal with personal issues Raitt was struggling with at the time. For example, Raitt was almost forty years old when Nick of Time was released, and the album's title track is about coming to terms with middle age. According to biographer Mark Bego, Raitt sought to make an album for the baby boomer generation. "Unlike her past releases, there were no 'you've done me wrong' songs or tearful laments about love lost. The songs were much more personal" said Bego. Nick of Time features two original songs and nine cover songs.

Release
Nick of Time was released on March 21, 1989. Devine was unable to convince Capitol Records' marketing team to promote Raitt, and instead had to ask the president of the company to put full page ads in music magazines. Despite the limited promotion, Nick of Time sold very well for the first few months, and quickly became the best selling album of Raitt's career. It debuted at number 105 on the Billboard 200, and slowly climbed the chart until peaking at number 1 on April 6, 1990. The seventeen and a half year stretch between Raitt's first album to chart on the Billboard 200–Give It Up in 1972–and Nick of Time broke the record for the longest period of time it took an artist to have a number 1 album. By 2019, Nick of Time had sold over five million copies, and helped revitalize Raitt's career. When asked why Nick of Time sold as well as it did, publicist Joan Myers said: "Bonnie's personality and sincerity just won people's hearts, in addition to her music. There was nothing ever pretentious about her."

Bego identifies the music video for "Thing Called Love" as an important factor to the commercial success of Nick of Time. With the rise of MTV and VH1 in the 1980s, the music video helped expose Raitt to a younger generation of listeners. In the video, Raitt performs in a bar, and acts flirtateous with a patron played by Dennis Quaid. "Thing Called Love" was one of three singles from Nick of Time; the other two were "Love Letter" and "Have a Heart," the latter of which reached number 49 on the Billboard Hot 100.

Reception

In 2003, Nick of Time was ranked number 229 on Rolling Stone magazine's list of the 500 greatest albums of all time. It was ranked number 230 on the 2012 edition of the list, and number 492 on the 2020 edition. The record was voted number 615 in the third edition of Colin Larkin's All Time Top 1000 Albums (2000), and was also included in the book 1001 Albums You Must Hear Before You Die.

In 2022, the Library of Congress selected Nick of Time for preservation in the United States National Recording Registry as a "culturally, historically, or aesthetically significant" work.

Track listing

Personnel 

 Bonnie Raitt – lead vocals, electric piano (1, 9), slide guitar (2, 3, 4), guitar (5, 6, 11), backing vocals (5)
 Scott Thurston – keyboards (3, 7)
 Michael Ruff – keyboards (4)
 Jerry Lynn Williams – acoustic piano (5)
 Don Was – keyboards (8)
 Herbie Hancock – acoustic piano (10)
 Michael Landau – guitar (1, 3)
 Johnny Lee Schell – acoustic guitar (2), backing vocals (2), guitar (3, 9)
 Arthur Adams – guitar (3)
 John Jorgenson – guitar (8)
 Jay Dee Maness – pedal steel guitar (8)
 James "Hutch" Hutchinson – bass (1, 2, 3, 5, 7, 8, 9)
 Chuck Domanico – acoustic bass (4, 6)
 Preston Hubbard – bass (11)
 Ricky Fataar – drums (1, 2, 3, 5, 7, 8, 9), percussion (1)
 Fran Christina – drums (11)
 Paulinho da Costa – congas (1), percussion (4, 7)
 Tony Braunagel – percussion (2, 5), timbales (2), drums (4)
 Marty Grebb – tenor saxophone (3, 9)
 Heart Attack Horns – horns (3, 9)
 Bill Bergman – saxophone 
 Greg Smith – saxophone 
 John Berry, Jr. – trumpet 
 Dennis Farias – trumpet 
 Kim Wilson – harmonica (5, 11)
 Sir Harry Bowens – backing vocals (1, 3, 8, 9, 11)
 Arnold McCuller – backing vocals (1, 7, 8, 11)
 Sweet Pea Atkinson – backing vocals (3, 8, 9, 11)
 David Crosby – backing vocals (4)
 Graham Nash – backing vocals (4)
 Larry John McNally – backing vocals (5)
 David Lasley – backing vocals (7)
 Greg Fulginiti – mastering

Charts and certifications

Weekly charts

Year-end charts

Certifications

Awards
Grammy Awards of 1990

References

Sources

1989 albums
Albums produced by Don Was
Bonnie Raitt albums
Capitol Records albums
Grammy Award for Album of the Year
Grammy Award for Best Female Rock Vocal Performance
United States National Recording Registry recordings
United States National Recording Registry albums